is a Japanese actor. He started acting at the age of three in education programs. He is currently studying at Hosei University Business Faculty. He is frequently cast as geeky or otaku characters. Itō is the older brother of the actor and voice actor Takahiro Itō, who committed suicide in 2009. He was married on May 1, 2010 and has a daughter born on October 29, 2015.

Filmography

Television
 Kamen Norida as Chibi Norida (1989)
 Kasugano-Tsubone (NHK, 1989)
 Wataru Seken wa Oni Bakari as Noboru Kojima (TBS, seasons one and two)
 Daihyo Torishimariyaku Deka (TV Asahi, 1990 1991)
 The Ugly Duckling as Kenta Yamamoto (Fuji TV, 1996)
 Special Ghost Stories of the Students By the Spring as Kazu (KTV, Mar 27, 2001)
 I'll be eighteen tomorrow as Akira Saiki (NHK, Nov 23, 2001)
 Zenigata Ai as Takaaki Yamaguchi (in episode 2, BS-i, 2002)
 Over the Hill (HTB, Aug 25, 2003)
 Suekko Chounan Ane Sannin as Daisuke Yamada (TBS, 2003)
 Sheeraza Do (NHK, 2004)
 Aijou Ippon as Noboru Todoroki (NTV, 2004) 
 People planting home as Shuichi Toyama (TBS, Oct 20, 2004)
 Honto ni Atta Kowai Hanashi Those Which Live in the Darkness as Yuya Satake (Fuji TV, Oct 25, 2004)
 Yoshitsune as Kisanta (NHK, 2005)
 Last Present as Shosuke Mizuhara (TV Asahi, June 11, 2005)
 Umizaru Fuji (in episode one, 2005)
 Densha Otoko as Tsuyoshi Yamada (Densha Otoko) (Fuji TV, 2005)
 Saiyūki as Cho Hakkai (Fuji TV, 2006)
 Yonimo Kimyona Monogatari Replay as Shuichi Tanabe (Fuji TV, Mar 28, 2006)
 Honto ni Atta Kowai Hanashi Under Precipice (Fuji TV, Aug 22, 2006)
 Densha Otoko DX~Saigo no Seizen as Tsuyoshi Yamada (Densha Otoko) (Fuji TV,Sep 23, 2006)
 Iwo Jima: Senjo no Yubin Haitatsu as Masayoshi Namoto (Fuji TV, Dec 9, 2006)
 Kamisama Kara Hitokoto (WOWOW, Dec 24, 2006)
 Serendip no Kiseki as Mikio Hatano (NTV, Mar 12, 2007, Story 2)
 Watashitachi no Kyoukasho as Kohei Kaji (Fuji TV, 2007)
 Teacher Road Terrestrial Last Teacher as Teacher Part (TBS, 2007, Episode 9)
 Kim Hyon Hui wo Toraeta Otokotachi ~Fuuin Sareta Mikkakan~ (Fuji TV, Dec 15, 2007)
 Galileo Bangaihen Yungeru as Kouji Yanagizawa (Fuji TV, Jan 1, 2008)
 Loss Time Life as Hajime Moriyasu (Fuji TV, 2008, Story 5)
 Naito Daisuke Monogatari as Daisuke Naito (TBS, July 28, 2008)
 Arigatou! Champy as Kyoshi Kawai (Fuji TV, Sep 13, 2008)
 Team Batista no Eiko as Kohei Taguchi (Fuji TV, 2008)
 Hyoryu Net Cafe as Koichi Toki (TBS, 2009)
 The Rival: Shonen Sunday vs. Shonen Magazine as Jin Makabe (NHK, May 5, 2009)
 Samayoi Zakura as Keiichi Haiba (Fuji TV, May 30, 2009)
 Oyaji no Ichiban Nagai Hi as Shoichiro Sumida (Fuji TV, June 19, 2009)
 Team Batista no Eiko SP : Aratana Meikyuu e no Shoutai as Kohei Taguchi (Fuji TV, Sep 15, 2009)
 Yonimo Kimyona Monogatari Ideal Sukiyaki as Kazuki Nishimura (Fuji TV, Oct 5, 2009)
 Team Batista no Eiko SP : Nightingale no Chinmoku as Kohei Taguchi (Fuji TV, Oct 9, 2009)
 General Rouge no Gaisen as Kohei Taguchi (Fuji TV, 2010)
 Mori no Asagao as Naoki Oikawa (TV Tokyo, 2010)
 Team Batista SP : Saraba General! Tensai Kyuumeii wa Aisuru Hito o Sukue as Kohei Taguchi (Fuji TV, Jan 2, 2011)
 Propose Kyodai as Kazuo Tanaka (Fuji TV, Feb 21-24, 2011)
 Ariadne no Dangan as Kohei Taguchi (Fuji TV, 2011)
 Chouchou-san as Isaku Tanigawa (young) (NHK, Nov 19 and 26, 2011)
 SPEC ~Keishichou Kouanbu Kouan Daigoka Mishou Jiken Tokubetsu Taisakugakari Jikenbo~ Shou as Atsushi Ito (cameo) (TBS Apr 1, 2012)
 Bayside Shakedown The TV Special as Shinjiro Waku (Fuji TV, 2012)
 Miyabe Gokujou as Shuji Sakura (TBS May 14, 2012)
 Sarutobi Sansei as Sarutobi Sasuke (NHK, 2012)
 Double Face - Sennyuu Sosa Hen as Hiroshi (TBS, 2012)
 Apoyan - Hashiru Kokusai Kuukou as Keita Endo (TBS, 2013)
 Radenmeikyuu as Kohei Taguchi (Fuji TV, 2014)
 Mozu Season 1 - Mozu no Sakebu Yoru as Keisuke Narumiya (TBS, 2014)
 Mozu Season 2 - Maboroshi no Tsubasa as Keisuke Narumiya (WOWOW, 2014)
 Kazokugari as Shunsuke Sudo (TBS, 2014)
 Science of people as Yoshitani (Hikaritv, 2014)
 鵜飼いに恋した夏 as Kaorutaira Sasamoto (NHK, November 12, 2014)
Mutsu - Mieru Me as Junichiro Hayase (Fuji TV, 2015)
Ohsugi Tantei Jimukyoku as Keisuke Narumiya (TBS, 2015)
Toto Neechan as Shohei Mizuta (NHK, 2016)
 Homesickness 海の星 as Yohei Hamasaki (TV Tokyo, 2016)
Daibinbo as Shinichi Kakihara (Fuji TV, 2017)
Smartphone is in Brain as Keita Orimo (NTV-YTV, 2017)
Hello Harinezumi as Kawada (TBS, 2017)
 龍馬　最後の３０日 as Kenzaburo Okamoto (NHK, November 19, 2017)
 Oh My Jump as Hiroshi Tsukiyama (TV Tokyo, 2018)
 Raven of the White Day as Masato Nitta (TV Asahi, Jan 11, 2018)
Zettai Reido 3 as Toru Sadaharu (Fuji TV, 2018)
Meitantei Akechi Kogoro as Yoshio Kobayashi (TV Asahi, 2019)
Kyo, Kaerimasu as Katsuhiro Morita (WOWOW, March 10, 2019)

Movies
 A Sign Days (1989)
 Tetto Musashino-sen as Miharu Tamaki (1997)
 Gakko III (1998)
 Boy's Choir as Michio Yanagida (2000)
 Fifteen as Dobashi Kinichi (2001)
 When the Last Sword Is Drawn as Young Chiaki Ono (2003)
 Kakuto as Naoshi (2003)
 Robocon as Yotsuya (or Robot Contest, 2003)
 Battlefield Baseball as Megane (2003)
 Kikyo (2004)
 Blood and Bones as Yong-il / Young Joon-pyong (2004)
 Amoretto (2004)
 Casshern (2004)
 Umizaru Evolution as Hajime Kudo (2005)
 Densha Otoko (movie version, cameo role, 2005)
 The Adventures of Super Monkey as Cho Hakkai (Saiyûki Movie, 2007)
 Flowers in the Shadows as Raita (2008)
 Kanki no Uta as Shunsuke Kato (2008)
 Fish Story as Shigeki (2009)
 Amalfi: Megami No 50-Byou as Mikiyasu Taniki (2009)
 Yazima Beauty Salon The Movie: Reaching a Nevada Dream (2010)
 Bayside Shakedown 3 as Shinjiro Waku (2010)
 SPEC: The Movie as Atsushi Ito (2012)
 Bayside Shakedown The Final as Shinjiro Waku (2012)
 Bokutachi no Kōkan Nikki as Yohei tanaka (2013)
 Team Batista Final: Kerberos no Shōzō as Kohei Taguchi (2014)
 Birigal as Yoshitaka Tsubota (2015)
 Boku wa Bosan as Koen Shirakawa (2015)
 Mozu as Keisuke Narumiya (2015)
 Cat Collection's House as Masaru Sakumoto (2017)
 Horoyoi Sakaba as Yoshio Higuru (2017)
 Ninkyō Gakuen (2019)
 Mirai eno Katachi (2021)

Mobile Dorama
 Izumi as Kosuke (au, 2009)
 Kakaricho Aoshima Shunsaku 2 Jiken-wa Matamata Torishirabeshitsu-de Okiteiru! as Shinjiro Waku (notty, 2012)

Music video
 Dreams Come True [JET!!!/SUNSHINE]

Awards
 25th Japanese Film Critics Awards - Best Supporting Actor for Birigal
 39th Japan Academy Award - Outstanding Supporting Actor for Birigal
 2006 Elan d'or Awards - Newcomer Awards Winner for Yoshitsune, Densha Otoko
 46th Television Drama Academy Awards - Best Supporting Actor for Densha Otoko
 41st ACC FESTIVAL - Starring Awards 2001 for CM Calorie Mate
 28th Shanghai Television Festival - Best Actor for I'll be eighteen tomorrow

References

External links
 Itō Atsushi at Yahoo! Japan
 Itō Atsushi at JDorama.com
 
 Saiyûki Movie Official Site
 Kagehinata ni Saku Official Site
 NileNile.net profile 

Japanese male child actors
Japanese male film actors
Japanese male television actors
People from Funabashi
1983 births
Living people
Hosei University alumni
Actors from Chiba Prefecture
20th-century Japanese actors
21st-century Japanese actors